This is a list of ASEAN country subdivisions by GDP using data from Indonesian provinces, Malaysia states, and Philippine and Thai regions. GDP and GDP per capita data are according to International Monetary Fund's October 2021 estimates. Badan Pusat Statistik Indonesia, Department of Statistics Malaysia, Philippine Statistics Authority, NESDC Thailand.

By metropolitan area

By city proper

By administrative division
Only above U$10 billion by 2021 data

See also
List of ASEAN countries by GDP
List of Indonesian provinces by GDP
List of Indonesian provinces by GRP per capita
List of Thai provinces by GPP
List of regions of the Philippines by GDP
List of Malaysian states by GDP
List of Vietnamese subdivisions by GDP
List of countries in Asia-Pacific by GDP (nominal)
List of countries by GDP (nominal)
List of countries by GDP (PPP)

References

External links 
 4 ASEAN infographics: population, market, economy

Lists of countries by GDP
GDP
ASEAN countries GDP
GDP ASEAN
Lists of administrative divisions
Ranked lists of country subdivisions